The Sims Carnival was a casual games series created by Electronic Arts. The Sims Carnival had two separate product lines.  First, it was an online community of crowd-sourced games.  Second, it was a line of packaged game titles sold via retail stores and digital download.

Online Game Community
From the studio that created The Sims and SimCity, SimsCarnival.com was an online community centered on playing, creating and sharing games with a vibrant ecosystem of players and creators.

This online community was supported by a suite of game creation tools, audio and graphic asset packs, a YouTube-style website with leaderboard and other social features, plenty of first-party games, ongoing content releases, community support, and countless user-generated games across many genres (e.g. sports, puzzles, adventure games, racing games, tower defense games, Angry Birds games).

Three game creation tools—The Wizard, The Swapper and The Game Creator—were the player's assistants in game design. The Wizard led players through the process of creating a game step-by-step with intuitive options designed to help them create their own game (e.g., make their own Tower Defense game) with a library of game genres to choose from. The Swapper let players customize existing games – or newly made games from The Wizard - with their own selection of images, aiding in game personalization. With The Game Creator, and its library of images, animations and sounds, individuals could create a game from scratch or dive deep into customizing another player's creation.

Intended as a game about games, the mission of SimsCarnival.com was to democratize the art of game creation. Because the games were "open source", players could take someone else's creation, give the original creators attributions and customize the games as they see fit (e.g., apply different graphics and storyline).

SimsCarnival.com debuted at the GDC (Game Developers Conference) in February 2008 with a keynote speech by the studio head of The Sims.  The service ceased in January 2011.

Highlights in the Press:
1UP: “…I actually think that The Sims Carnival -- a site where users can create and play their own minigames -- is one of EA's most intriguing ideas yet…” 
Joystiq: "…you can play some of the offerings from closed beta folks, who've come up with some really bizarre entries like this terrible take on Mario Kart and this brûlée caramelizing Sim. You can also design your own games for the general populace to partake of, enjoy and never, ever pay you for."
Kotaku: "EA's web-based game creation TheSimsCarnival.com has officially entered open beta, and not a moment too soon!" 
IGN: "There is bound to be a game that you love -- and if not, you can make it! Since its inception in February 2008, SimsCarnival.com has built an active online community where nearly 1 in 4 visitors during Closed Beta have created and published their own games."
MTV: "But Electronic Arts thinks it has a solution with Sims Carnival. You needn't know a programming language; just apply your creativity to their already-built toolsets. Currently in beta, I hopped on the Sims Carnival website to see what people have created."
Gameplanet: "TheSimsCarnival.com in open beta. This games destination website has hundreds of games of all kinds and creators are adding more every day"
PC Magazine: "The tools provided at the site empower players to become game creators at any programming skill level, from novice to Flash developers."

Packaged Titles

Two packaged game titles were announced around December 2007, and were available for download on the EA Link site. Outside of the shared brand name, there was no connection between SimsCarnival.com and these two packaged game titles (e.g. no user-generated games in these two titles).

Bumperblast
A Sim themed shoot 'em up.

Snap City
Snap City is a puzzle based spin-off of SimCity released on January 8, 2008. SnapCity is not an on-line game but single-player only. It comes with the software bundle The SimCity Box.

The game is played by placing residential, commercial, and industrial zones, which consist of tiles that fall like in Tetris, onto flat map. Players can build a special zone where civic buildings like schools and parks if enough zones are placed next to each other. Zones must be connected by roads to develop. Natural disasters can also occur, which harm the city's treasury. There are two main game modes; creative mode and story mode. In creative mode, play is open-ended, but in story mode there are a total of 25 goals in different cities that the player has to accomplish.

Kevin VanOrd of GameSpot gave the game 4.5/10 and compared the game to Tetris and said that "[the game] is easy to play, but it's hard to wrap your head around."

References

External links
SimsCarnival.com

Carnival
2007 video games
Browser games
Social simulation video games
Internet properties disestablished in 2011
Video games developed in the United States